The phrase "National Democratic Convention" may refer to either of
 National Democratic Convention (South Africa), a political party in South Africa
 Democratic National Convention, a presidential nominating convention held every four years by the Democratic party of the United States

See also
National Democratic Coalition (Nigeria)